Kang Sun-il is a North Korean former footballer. He represented North Korea on at least two occasions between 1998 and 1999, scoring twice. He was also part of the squad at the 1998 Asian Games.

Career statistics

International

International goals
Scores and results list North Korea's goal tally first, score column indicates score after each North Korea goal.

References

Date of birth unknown
Living people
North Korean footballers
North Korea international footballers
Association footballers not categorized by position
Footballers at the 1998 Asian Games
Asian Games competitors for North Korea
Year of birth missing (living people)